Carnaxide is a former civil parish in the municipality of Oeiras, Portugal. In 2013, the parish merged into the new parish Carnaxide e Queijas. The population in 2011 was 25,911, in an area of 6.51 km². It was elevated to town on August 16, 1991. Having first appeared in official documentation in the 14th century, its existence goes back as far as 13th century.

Economy 
Its principal economic activities reside in the presence of large international companies like EFACEC, Sumol + Compal (former Sumol), and Mota-Engil, and in the strong reliance on the small commerce. Also localized there are Sociedade Independente de Comunicação (SIC) television station and the business parks Parque Suécia, NeoPark and Parque Holanda.

References

 Lei 17-P/1993 - Portuguese law diploma, declaring the new town limits for Carnaxide

External links 
 Junta de Freguesia de Carnaxide - Official page of the town
 CarnaxideDigital - Local site with information about this village (in Portuguese)

Former parishes of Oeiras, Portugal
Carnaxide e Queijas